West Athens Hill Site is an archaeological site located at Athens in Greene County, New York.

It was listed on the National Register of Historic Places in 1973.

References

Archaeological sites on the National Register of Historic Places in New York (state)
Geography of Greene County, New York
National Register of Historic Places in Greene County, New York